This is a list of people who currently serve in one of the provincial or territorial legislative assemblies in Canada who are members of the New Democratic Party.

The NDP does not currently hold any seats in the Legislative Assemblies of Quebec, Prince Edward Island or New Brunswick. The territorial assemblies in Nunavut and the Northwest Territories, additionally, are non-partisan consensus government bodies.

Alberta

The Alberta New Democrats currently hold 24 (of the 87) seats in the Legislative Assembly of Alberta, forming the official opposition.

 Rachel Notley, party leader and Leader of the Opposition
 Deron Bilous
 Jon Carson
 Joe Ceci
 Lorne Dach
 Thomas Dang
 Jasvir Deol
 David Eggen
 Richard Feehan
 Kathleen Ganley
 Nicole Goehring
 Christina Gray
 Janis Irwin
 Sarah Hoffman
 Rod Loyola
 Chris Nielsen
 Rakhi Pancholi
 Shannon Phillips
 Marie Renaud
 Irfan Sabir
 Marlin Schmidt
 David Shepherd
 Lori Sigurdson
 Heather Sweet

British Columbia

The British Columbia New Democratic Party currently hold 41 (of the 87) seats in the Legislative Assembly of British Columbia, forming the government.

 John Horgan, party leader and Premier
 Robin Austin
 Harry Bains
 Spencer Chandra Herbert
 Raj Chouhan
 Katrine Conroy
 Kathy Corrigan
 Judy Darcy
 Adrian Dix
 Doug Donaldson
 David Eby
 Mable Elmore
 Mike Farnworth
 Rob Fleming
 Scott Fraser
 Sue Hammell
 George Heyman
 Gary Holman
 Carole James
 Maurine Karagianis
 Leonard Krog
 Norm Macdonald
 Melanie Mark
 Michelle Mungall
 Lana Popham
 Bruce Ralston
 Jennifer Rice
 Selina Robinson
 Bill Routley
 Doug Routley
 Jane Shin
 Nicholas Simons
 Shane Simpson
 Claire Trevena
 Jodie Wickens

Manitoba

The Manitoba New Democratic Party holds 18 (of the 57) seats in the Legislative Assembly of Manitoba, forming the Official Opposition.

 Wab Kinew (Wabanakwut), Party leader and Leader of the Opposition
 Danielle Adams
 Nello Altomare
 Uzoma Asagwara
 Diljeet Brar
 Ian Bushie
 Nahanni Fontaine
 Amanda Lathlin
 Tom Lindsey
 Jim Maloway
 Malaya Marcelino
 Jamie Moses
 Lisa Naylor
 Adrien Sala
 Mintu Sandhu
 Bernadette Smith
 Mark Wasyliw
 Matt Wiebe

Newfoundland and Labrador

The New Democratic Party of Newfoundland and Labrador currently holds two seats in the Newfoundland and Labrador House of Assembly, and is the third party.

 Lorraine Michael
 Gerry Rogers

Nova Scotia

The Nova Scotia New Democratic Party currently holds five seats in the Nova Scotia House of Assembly, and is the third party.
 Sterling Belliveau
 Denise Peterson-Rafuse
 Lisa Roberts
 Dave Wilson
 Lenore Zann

Ontario

The Ontario New Democratic Party holds 20 seats in the Legislative Assembly of Ontario, and is the third party.

 Andrea Horwath, party leader
 Teresa Armstrong
 Gilles Bisson
 Sarah Campbell
 Cheri DiNovo
 Catherine Fife
 Cindy Forster
 Jennifer French
 Wayne Gates
 France Gélinas
 Lisa Gretzky
 Percy Hatfield
 Michael Mantha
 Paul Miller
 Taras Natyshak
 Peggy Sattler
 Jagmeet Singh
 Peter Tabuns
 Monique Taylor
 John Vanthof

Saskatchewan

The Saskatchewan New Democratic Party holds ten seats in the Legislative Assembly of Saskatchewan, forming the official opposition.

 Trent Wotherspoon, interim parliamentary leader and Leader of the Opposition
 Carla Beck
 Buckley Belanger
 Danielle Chartier
 David Forbes
 Warren McCall
 Nicole Rancourt
 Nicole Sarauer
 Cathy Sproule
 Doyle Vermette

Yukon

The Yukon New Democratic Party holds six seats in the Yukon Legislative Assembly, forming the official opposition.

 Elizabeth Hanson, party leader and Leader of the Opposition
 Kevin Barr
 Lois Moorcroft
 Jan Stick
 Jim Tredger
 Kate White

See also
List of New Democratic Party (Canada) members of parliament

Members